Choi Kyu-Woong (also Choi Gyu-Wung, ; born May 28, 1990 in Busan) is a South Korean swimmer, who specialized in breaststroke events. He shared silver medals with China's Xue Ruipeng in the 200 m breaststroke at the 2010 Asian Games in Guangzhou, China, in a time of 2:12.25. He also collected two medals (silver and bronze) in both 100 and 200 m breaststroke at the 2009 East Asian Games in Hong Kong, China. Choi is a member of the swimming team at the Korea National Sport University in Seoul, under his personal coach Lee Woo-Shin.

Choi qualified for the men's 200 m breaststroke at the 2012 Summer Olympics in London, by breaking a South Korean record and clearing a FINA A-standard time of 2:11.17 from the FINA World Championships in Shanghai, China. He challenged seven other swimmers on the third heat, including former silver medalist Dániel Gyurta of Hungary and local favorite Michael Jamieson of Great Britain. Choi raced to seventh place by less than 0.04 of a second behind Ukraine's Igor Borysik in 2:13.57. Choi failed to advance into the semifinals, as he placed twenty-fifth overall in the preliminary heats.

He also qualified for the 2016 Olympics, again in the 200 m breaststroke.

References

External links
NBC Olympics Profile

1990 births
Living people
South Korean male breaststroke swimmers
Olympic swimmers of South Korea
Swimmers at the 2012 Summer Olympics
Swimmers at the 2016 Summer Olympics
Asian Games medalists in swimming
Swimmers at the 2010 Asian Games
Swimmers at the 2014 Asian Games
Sportspeople from Busan
Asian Games silver medalists for South Korea
Medalists at the 2010 Asian Games
21st-century South Korean people